Oleksandr Valeriyovych Zakharuk (born August 25, 1976 in Kiev) is a retired amateur Ukrainian freestyle wrestler, who competed in the men's featherweight category. Considered one of the world's top freestyle wrestlers in his decade, Zakharuk had claimed five European championship titles, picked up three bronze medals at the World Championships (1999, 2002, and 2003), and achieved top eight finishes in two editions of the Olympic Games (2000 and 2004). Throughout his sporting career, Zakharuk trained as a member of the freestyle wrestling team for Ukraina Kyiv Sport Club, under his coach Serhiy Obesnyuk.

Zakharuk entered the 2000 Summer Olympics in Sydney, as a top medal contender, in the men's bantamweight category (54 kg), after claiming a bronze from the 1999 World Wrestling Championships in Ankara, Turkey. During the preliminary pool, Zakharuk pinned neighboring Russia's Leonid Chuchunov on his opening bout, and then eclipsed Bulgaria's Ivan Tsonov with a powerful effort and a 10-point advantage to earn him a spot for the quarterfinals. Followed by the next morning's session, Zakharuk fell behind U.S. wrestler and 1998 world champion Sammie Henson with a score 4–8, before he sought a chance to fight back in a consolation battle against Kazakhstan's Maulen Mamyrov for a fifth-place finish.

At the 2004 Summer Olympics in Athens, Zakharuk qualified for his second Ukrainian squad, as a 28-year-old, in the men's featherweight class (55 kg) with another brilliant sporting record. After the abolition of the bantamweight division in amateur wrestling that propelled him to fight at least a single kilogram heavier than in 2000, Zakharuk picked up his third career bronze medal in the men's featherweight category at the 2003 World Wrestling Championships in New York City, New York, United States, which earned him a spot on the Ukrainian Olympic team. He continued to deliver a more stellar performance from Sydney four years earlier by pinning Kazakhstan's Baurzhan Orazgaliyev and overpowering Belarusian wrestler and 2001 world champion Herman Kantoyeu to seize another shot of an Olympic medal. Fighting against Russia's Mavlet Batirov in the quarterfinal match, Zakharuk could not score a single point to push him off the mat, and instead, managed to finish only in seventh at the end of the tournament.

References

External links
 

1976 births
Living people
Olympic wrestlers of Ukraine
Wrestlers at the 2000 Summer Olympics
Ukrainian male sport wrestlers
Wrestlers at the 2004 Summer Olympics
Sportspeople from Kyiv
World Wrestling Championships medalists
European Wrestling Championships medalists